Shalan may refer to:
 Shalan, Kermanshah (شلان - Shalān)
 Shalan, Dalahu (شالان - Shālān), Kermanshah Province
shalan joudry, Canadian writer